Chionomus is a genus of delphacid planthoppers in the family Delphacidae. There are about 14 described species in Chionomus. They are found in North, Central, and South America, including  the Caribbean.

Species
These species belong to the genus Chionomus:

 Chionomus balboae (Muir & Giffard, 1924)
 Chionomus banosensis (Muir, 1926)
 Chionomus bellicosus (Muir & Giffard, 1924)
 Chionomus cultus (Van Duzee, 1907)
 Chionomus dissipatus (Muir, 1926)
 Chionomus dolonus Weglarz & Bartlett 2020
 Chionomus gluciophilus (Muir, 1926)
 Chionomus havanae (Muir & Giffard, 1924)
 Chionomus haywardi (Muir, 1929)
 Chionomus herkos Weglarz & Bartlett 2020
 Chionomus pacificus (Crawford, 1914)
 Chionomus puellus (Van Duzee, 1897)
 Chionomus quadrispinosus (Muir & Giffard, 1924)
 Chionomus tenae (Muir, 1926)

References

Delphacidae